Vyacheslav Vyacheslavovich Razbegaev (born 14 October 1965) is a Russian actor. He appeared in more than sixty films since 1990.

Early life
Vyacheslav Razbegaev was born in Moscow, Russian SFSR, Soviet Union. 
He studied at school No. 356 of Pervomaisky district (1972), boarding school No. 19 of the Sevastopol district (from 1973 to 1979), at school No. 716 in Pervomaisky district (1979 to 1982).
After the school year worked at the plant "Salyut".

In 1983 he was drafted for military service in the Soviet Army, served in the Far Eastern Military District.

After the army, he worked for almost three years as a decorator at the Mosfilm studios. And there, having plunged into the atmosphere of cinema, decided to become an actor. Especially since he had not had an education, he was able to withdraw in the episode of the film Interception (1986), although it was not indicated in the credits.

In 1988 he entered the Moscow Art Theater School, on the course of I.M. Tarkhanov, who graduated in 1992. After graduation he entered the troupe of the Central Academic Theater of the Soviet Army.

Career
The first serious work in Soviet film - a role in the popular adventure film The Deerslayer (1990). In the early 1990s, the actor starred in several other films Woman in the Sea (1992), The Flight of the Night Butterfly (1992), Weather Is Good on Deribasovskaya, It Rains Again on Brighton Beach (1992).

Personal life
He is married to Natalya Razbegaeva, and they have two daughters.

Selected filmography

Film

Television

References

External links 

1965 births
Living people
Soviet male film actors
Soviet male stage actors
Russian male film actors
Russian male television actors
Russian male stage actors
Male actors from Moscow
21st-century Russian male actors
Moscow Art Theatre School alumni